Strate School of Design (formerly known as Strate College) is a French private institution for technical education founded in 1993. Its main campus is in Sèvres south-west of Paris. It is dedicated to the teaching of industrial design, 3D modeling and design thinking. The school is recognized by the French state and its design degree is certified by the French Ministry of Higher Education.

Key dates 
1993

Jean-René Talopp, former designer and director of the "ESDI" design school, founds the « Strate Collège ».

2010

The school moves to a new campus in Sèvres.

2013

Dominique Sciamma becomes the director of Strate.

2014

The school changes its name to « Strate School of Design », its logo and adopts a new motto: «Making the world +simple, +fair, +beautiful».

2015

The Strate Executive Education programme is launched to train professionals and managerial staff to Design Thinking and innovation by design.

Strate is recognized by the French state in the publication of the "Bulletin Officiel de l'Enseignement Supérieur et de la Recherche" on 7 December 2015. This has entitled the school to welcome government scholars for the design and modeling courses since 2017.

2017

The Ministry’s of Higher Education "Bulletin Officiel de l'Enseignement Supérieur et de la Recherche" lists the school as one of the few design schools in France to deliver a diploma recognized by the Minister in charge of higher education.

Teaching 
Some programs last five years (bac+5), others three (MBA). The two main subjects in the curriculum are design and modeling.

Design course 
The first two years of the Design course are about teaching the fundamentals of drawing, perspective, modeling and design methodology.

In the third year the students specialize in one major: product, transportation, packaging & retail, or interaction. A first six-month internship takes place in the third year.

In year four, the students are requested to spend the first semester abroad either at a partner design school of the CUMULUS association, or by doing an internship. The students then come back to school for a period of projects with partner companies.

The fifth year is dedicated to the preparation of the diploma. Students are requested to write a memoir and formalize their project, which they present to a jury of professionals (independent designers, designers in agencies, office managers, marketing managers). After this presentation students are requested to do a final internship in France or abroad.

3D Modeling course 
The 3D modeling course is a 3-year undergraduate diploma which teaches traditional and digital modeling.

Degrees 

Strate delivers the diploma of «industrial designer », which is recognized by the government as a level I title for the 5 years of studies after the French baccalaureate (niveau I RNCP code 200n, JO du 06-07-08). Since the publication of the Higher Education Ministry "Bulletin Officiel de l'Enseignement Supérieur et de la Recherche" on June the 29th 2017 the school is one of the few design schools in France to deliver a degree referred to by the Minister of higher education.

For the design course two double diploma agreements exist with Grenoble School of Management and Sciences Po Paris.

Two double degree designer-manager options are offered to students by doing an additional tuition-free year at Grenoble School of Management or Sciences Po Paris.

Programs taught in English

Master in Design in Transportation 
The master in Design in Transportation is a 2-year post-graduate master's degree. It is recognized by the French State through its registration by the National Council of Professional Certification (RNCP) at Level 1.

Master in design for Smart Cities 
The master in design for smart cities is a 2-year post-graduate master's degree. The course can take place in Paris and Singapore. It is recognized by the French State through its registration by the National Council of Professional Certification (RNCP) at Level 1.

Partnerships

Academic partnerships 
For the design course student exchanges are made with other schools of the international association of art & design universities CUMULUS.

Two double degree agreements exist with Grenoble School of Management and Sciences Po Paris.

The school has developed the collaborative project "CPi" (Conception de produit innovant) with engineering school Centrale Supélec and ESSEC Business School. For 9 months mixed teams of students of the three schools work on innovation challenges submitted by partner companies. Since 2005 over fifty compagnies have supported the program producing 150 students projects.

Since 2014 the "Design & Science Université Paris-Saclay" prize has been led by Strate. It was previously called "ArtScience Prize" from 2014 to 2016. It gathers students of Strate with students from prestigious French engineering schools such as Télécom ParisTech, CentraleSupélec, ENS Paris-Saclay or École Polytechnique to work on a same project. It aims to develop innovative ideas upon advanced scientific themes. Every year about 40 students work together on a same brief during six months and are coached by professors from their schools, the winners of the prize get a scholarship for the development of their project and other help.

Strate is one of the founding schools of the "Web School Factory" school in Paris.

Links with businesses 
The school has signed various agreements with compagnies to train the employees through the "Strate Executive Education" branch and companies to offer innovation, research projects and internship to students:
 Korian in October 2017
 Laval Virtual in March 2017
 CEA List in March 2017
 L'Oréal in March 2016
 Derichebourg Multiservices in September 2015
 Carrefour in June 2015
 Renault in December 2013

Research 
The school has a research branch "Strate Research" and is part of various French institutes:
 member of the "Institut Vedecom", for clean and sustainable transportation;
 member of "Institut Carnot Telecom & Société numérique" and has been labeled Carnot for the quality of its research partnerships;
 member of "Institut de recherche et d'innovation";
In June 2017 the laboratory "EXALT Design Lab" for design valorization in businesses is created at Strate in cooperation with 5 big companies and two major academic laboratories. All the partners are engaged for a 4 year research project.

Rankings 
The French student magazine "l'Étudiant" published some years a ranking of the "product design schools preferred by professionals" (écoles de design produit préférées des pros). There are about 77 design schools in France and Strate is regularly mentioned as one of the best.

In 2017 the student news website l'Étudiant said Strate School of Design distinguished itself for its dynamism, following closely the mutations of the designer's profession. And also by creating partnerships with foreign schools and collaboration with various research actors.

The school is well known in the car design world since its transportation design course exists since its schools opening in 1993. The website Car Design News by adding up all the successive results for the years 2011 to 2015 of student participations in the Car Design Awards competition ranked the school as one of the top transportation design school in the world.

Alumni 
The association "Strate Alumni" has over 1200 members.

International 
Strate School of design is a member of the international association CUMULUS. For the design course student exchanges are made with other schools of the international association of art & design universities CUMULUS.

The school is also a member of the World Design Organization, an international non-governmental organization that promotes the profession of industrial design and its ability to generate better products, systems, services, and experiences.

Singapore and Bangalore campuses 
Strate School of Design established in Singapore in 2017, and received in 2018 the registration from the Committee For Private Education / SkillsFuture (part of Ministry of Education).   Strate also signed a partnership with « Social Innovation Park », a not for profit organization aiming at Educate, Empower and Enhance social entrepreneurs and innovators.  The campus of Strate is located in the epicenter of Design for Singapore, namely the National Design Centre. 
Strate Singapore offers a suite of Design curricula of which the Master in Design for Smart Cities, in both full-time and part-time formats..

Strate School of Design opened in 2018 a large campus in Bangalore, India, together with other institutions from the Studialis group.

Ownership 
The school is a member of the Studialis group that belongs to the investment fund GALILEO.

References

Private universities and colleges in France
Design schools in France
Design schools in India
Industrial design
Buildings and structures in Hauts-de-Seine
Education in Île-de-France